The castra of Hunedoara was a fort in the Roman province of Dacia located on Hunedoara, Romania.
On this fort situated on Sânpetru Hill stationed vexillationes of Legion XIII Gemina.

See also
List of castra

Notes

External links
Roman castra from Romania - Google Maps / Earth

Roman vexillation forts in Romania